Feng Jixin (1915–2005) was a People's Republic of China politician. He was born in Jinzhai County, Anhui Province. A member of the New Fourth Army during the Second Sino-Japanese War, he was sent to Nenjiang Province (now part of Heilongjiang Province) in 1945. He was governor of Gansu (December 1979 – January 1981) and Chinese Communist Party Committee Secretary of Gansu (January 1981 – September 1982).

References

1915 births
2005 deaths
People's Republic of China politicians from Anhui
Chinese Communist Party politicians from Anhui
Governors of Gansu
Political office-holders in Gansu
Political office-holders in Heilongjiang
People from Jinzhai County
Politicians from Lu'an